Rollerdrome is an action video game developed by Roll7 and published by Private Division. The game was released on August 16, 2022, for Windows PC, PlayStation 4 and PlayStation 5.

Gameplay
In the game, players assume control of Kara Hassan, a participant in a deadly sport named "rollerdrome" in which they must perform roller-skating tricks while fighting against enemies known as "house players" using various firearms. It is played from a third-person perspective. Ammo is refilled by performing various roller-skating tricks, while enemies will drop health pick-ups when they are defeated. Players need to keep moving, dodge incoming attack, use a lock-on option to lock onto enemies, and briefly slow down time in order to aim. As players complete stages and levels, they will gradually unlock more powerful weapons such as grenade launchers and shotguns, though they will have to face more challenging enemies such as riot guards and snipers. Each stage also has optional challenges, which prompt players to perform feats such as eliminating enemies while performing tricks.

Development
Rollerdrome was developed by Roll7, the company behind the OlliOlli series. The game was initially a side project of solo game designer Paul Rabbitte, who subsequently joined Roll7 to finish this project. Rabbitte at that time described the game's prototype as a mix between Tony Hawk's games and Doom. The game's spent two years in production, with the team spending the first year of development deciding the core gameplay. They ultimately decided that Rollerdrome would primarily be a shooter game, though the skating mechanics will heavily complement with gunplay. Players will not fall despite failing to performing a trick. This is an intentional gameplay design decision to ensure that players can maintain their momentum in both skating and combat. According to lead producer Drew Jones, the game was "a wealth of fantastic inspiration from the 1970s", citing Rollerball and The Running Man as examples. The game features a stylized, cel-shaded visual style, since the team believed that a simple art-style would not compromise gameplay readability and that players would not be easily overwhelmed.

Roll7 and publisher Private Division announced the game on June 2, 2022 during Sony's State of Play event. The game was released for Windows PC, PlayStation 4 and PlayStation 5 on August 16, 2022.

Reception

According to review aggregator Metacritic, Rollerdrome released "generally favorable reviews" upon release.

GameSpot enjoyed the way the game incorporated skating gameplay with traditional third-person shooter mechanics, remarking "it never feels like the tricks are an impediment to the shooting; instead, they're the secret ingredient that helps Rollerdrome stand apart from other shooters". The Guardian praised the flow state that players could achieve with combos, but criticized the high difficulty spikes as "downright brutal". Game Informer liked how tricks were needed to reload, causing the player to rely on trying to "dazzle the crowd or down an adversary". The Washington Post felt that the game could be unclear on where the player could skate, writing "I often felt the wind knocked out of my sails when I failed to get that one wall ride to the balcony some gunman was on. It started to feel like a flaw in a certain map’s design and not a challenge". GamesRadar+ disliked how the game failed to make full usage of the arenas, "each arena may look different, but they rarely challenge you to use their layouts in creative ways". Eurogamer praised the artstyle, comparing it favorably to magazines and the works of Jean Giraud.

Accolades

References

External links
 

2022 video games
Action video games
Dystopian video games
Extreme sports video games
PlayStation 4 games
PlayStation 5 games
Private Division games
Roll7 games
Single-player video games
Third-person shooters
Video games developed in the United Kingdom
Video games featuring female protagonists
Video games set in the 2030s
Windows games